Mark McNee (born 9 July 1981 in Adelaide) is an Australian short track speed skater. He lives in Brisbane where he works as an engineer for Energy Developments Limited.

He has competed at the 2002 and 2006 Winter Olympics.

Results

2002 Winter Olympics 

 1000 m: 15th/29
 1500 m: 28th/29

2006 Winter Olympics 

 1000 m: 20th/20
 1500 m: 20th/24
 5000 m: 6th/8

References 
 
 Men's 1000 m - Short Track Torino 2006 Winter Olympics – Olympian Database
 Australian Olympic Committee: Mark McNee

1981 births
Living people
Australian male speed skaters
Australian male short track speed skaters
Olympic short track speed skaters of Australia
Short track speed skaters at the 2002 Winter Olympics
Short track speed skaters at the 2006 Winter Olympics
Sportspeople from Brisbane